Ashwathy Kurup (born 7 April 1970), better known by her stage name Parvathy and married name Parvathy Jayaram (Aswathi Jayaram) , is a former Indian actress, costume designer and classical dancer, who appeared in Malayalam films.

Parvathy was a popular actress in Malayalam cinema during the late-1980s and early-1990s. Her first film was directed by Lenin Rajendran, but was shelved and never released. She was introduced to the industry by actor-director Balachandra Menon through Vivahithare Ithile in 1986. Her notable works include  Oru Minnaminunginte Nurunguvettam (1987), Thoovanathumbikal (1987), Ponmuttayidunna Tharavu (1988), Aparan (1988), Vadakkunokkiyantram (1989), 1921 (1988),  Kireedam (1989), Peruvannapurathe Visheshangal (1989), Artham (1989), Utharam (1989), Jagratha (1989), Dr. Pasupathy (1990), Akkare Akkare Akkare (1990) Souhrudam (1991) and Kamaladalam (1992).

Parvathy married film actor Jayaram who was her co-star in many films on 7 September 1992 at Town Hall, Ernakulam. After marriage, Parvathy effectively quit acting in films by her own will. She now lives with her family in Chennai. She has two children, Kalidas Jayaram and Malavika Jayaram.

Personal life

Ashwathy Kurup was born as second among three children to Ramachandra Kurup and Padma Bai in Thiruvalla. Her father is from Champakulam, Alappuzha and her mother is from Kaviyoor, Thiruvalla. She has an elder sister Jyothi and a younger sister Deepthi (deceased). She had her primary education at Devaswom Board Higher Secondary School, Thiruvalla. Her mother was a maths teacher at the same school she studied at. She pursued a Pre-degree from NSS Hindu College, Changanassery. This was where she was discovered by director Lenin Rajendran, who cast her as the lead in a film that was shelved and was never released. She then acted in her first movie Vivahitare Itihile (1986), directed by Balachandra Menon at the age of 16.

Parvathy met her future husband Jayaram on the set of Aparan, at Udaya Studio in Alappuzha, in 1988. After her marriage on 7 September 1992, Parvathy stopped acting and later said that she has no regrets. "One spouse has to sacrifice their career, otherwise, it will be difficult to bring up the children properly. If there is a good salary earned by the husband, why should the wife work?"

The couple have two children, Kalidas Jayaram (born 1993) and Malavika (born 1996). Kalidas Jayaram won the National Film Award for Best Child Artist for his work in the film Ente Veedu Appuvinteyum (2003), in which he acted in along with his father, Jayaram. Currently, she resides at Valasaravakkam, Tamil Nadu with her family.

Filmography

As costume designer

 2005  Finger Print
 2005  Sarkar Dada
 2006  Madhuchandralekha
 2009   My Big Father

Television

References

External links
 

People from Pathanamthitta district
20th-century Indian actresses
Indian film actresses
Actresses from Kerala
Living people
1969 births
Actresses in Malayalam cinema
Indian female classical dancers
Performers of Indian classical dance
Dancers from Kerala
20th-century Indian dancers
20th-century Indian women artists
Women artists from Kerala
Actresses in Tamil cinema
Actresses in Malayalam television